Prom Queen is an honorary title at a high school prom.  

Prom Queen may also refer to:

Television
"Prom Queen" (Glee), an episode from the TV series
Prom Queen: The Marc Hall Story, a 2004 Canadian TV movie
Prom Queen (web series), a series of short online episodes
Prom Queen: Summer Heat
Prom Queens (TV series)

Music
"Prom Queen" (Lil Wayne song), 2009
"Prom Queen" (Beach Bunny song), 2018
Prom Queen, a 2018 EP by Beach Bunny
"Prom Queen", a 1993 song by Mambo Taxi
"Prom Queen", a 2017 song by Molly Kate Kestner

See also

Prom (disambiguation)